Stevan Pilipović (born 1950, Novi Sad, Serbia) is a Professor of Mathematics, since 1987, at the Department of Mathematics and Informatics of Novi Sad University.

Biography 
Since 2009, he is an academician of the Serbian Academy of Sciences and Arts. His research interests include functional analysis, generalized functions and hyperfunctions, pseudo-differential operators, time–frequency analysis, linear and nonlinear equations with singularities. Probability theory and stochastic processes. Moreover, he is also interested in applications of mathematics in mechanics with applications in medicine. Currently he is a president of the Novi Sad Branch of the Serbian Academy of Sciences and Arts and the leader of the Center of excellence Center for Mathematical Research in Nonlinear Phenomena at the Faculty of Science of Novi Sad University. He is Editor in chief of Publ. Inst. Math. (Beograd), NSJOM – Novi Sad Journal of Mathematics (Novi Sad).

Bibliography 

 Pilipović, S., Stanković, B., Takači, A., Asymptotic of Generalized Functions and the Stieltjes Transformation of Distributions, Teubner Texte zur Mathematik, Band 116, 1990.
 Nedeljkov, M., Pilipović, S., Scarpalezos, D., Linear Theory of Colombeau's Generalized Functions, Addison Wesley, Longman, 1998.
 Carmichael, R., Kaminski, A., Pilipović, S., Boundary Values and Convolution in Ultradistribution Spaces, ISAAC Series on Analysis Applications and Computations, Vol. 1, World Scientific, 2007.
 Pilipović, S., Stanković, B., Vindas, J., Asymptotic behavior of generalized functions. Series on Analysis, Applications and Computation, 5. World Scientific Publishing Co. Pte. Ltd., Hackensack, NJ, 2012.
 Atanacković, T. M., Pilipović, S., Stanković, B., Zorica, D., Fractional Calculus with Applica-tions in Mechanics: Vibrations and Diffusion Processes, ISTE – Wiley, 2014, London.
 Atanacković, T. M., Pilipović, S., Stanković, B., Zorica, Fractional Calculus with Applications in Mechanics: Wave Propagation, Impact and Variational Principles, ISTE – Wiley, 2014, London.

References

1950 births
Living people
Members of the Serbian Academy of Sciences and Arts
University of Novi Sad
Serbian mathematicians